SEPTA Route 53  is a former street car line and current bus route, operated by the Southeastern Pennsylvania Transportation Authority (SEPTA) in Philadelphia, Pennsylvania, United States.  The line runs between the West Mount Airy and Hunting Park neighborhoods primarily along Wayne Avenue.

Route description
SEPTA Route 53 starts at Carpenter's Woods in West Mount Airy. It follows Wayne Avenue east through a residential area, crossing over the Chestnut Hill West Line, shortly before passing Tulpehocken (SEPTA station). The route continues to run fairly closely to the rail line until Chelten Avenue, where the rail line dips to the south.

The scenery becomes less residential as the route approaches Wayne Junction.  After crossing under the railroad bridge by that station, the line turns south on Clarissa Street, crosses under the Roosevelt Expressway, and runs along the east side of SEPTA's Regional Rail Wayne Junction Yard before crossing West Hunting Park Avenue. At that point, the route continues on 18th Street, Pulaski Avenue, and 17th Street before turning left onto Erie Avenue, which carries SEPTA Route 56, another former street car converted into a bus route. (West-to-northbound buses use Pulaski Road all the way between Erie Avenue and 18th Street, as did the trolleys.) Both routes connect to Erie Station on the Broad Street Subway Line, as well as Germantown Avenue, which carries SEPTA Route 23. While SEPTA Route 56 continues northeast to the Torresdale-Cottman Loop in Tacony, Route 53 takes a left turn on 10th Street, and heads north towards the former Luzerne Depot, which became an all bus garage, and is now a cardboard recycling plant.
  A 2016 route change has certain buses continuing to the Hunting Park station on the Broad Street Line, as before, while others continue east along Hunting Park Avenue to G Street.

History

SEPTA Route 53 was established as the Wayne Avenue Line sometime before 1890, and was expanded in 1904, 1929, and 1930. Route 53 was the first streetcar line in Philadelphia to receive PCC cars. On Sundays Routes 53 and 75 streetcar lines were operated as one route between Mt. Airy and Bridesburg. This consolidated service ended when the Route 75 was converted to trackless trolley operation in 1948.

Route 53 was "temporarily" converted to buses in June 1981 because of a bridge reconstruction project. The conversion was made permanent May 16, 1985, when SEPTA track inspectors discovered misaligned rails on Wayne Avenue forcing buses to replace streetcars forever, and it was actually extended north of the former Luzerne Depot to Hunting Park (BSL station). Today, the northbound route passes Luzerne Street and makes a left turn at Lycoming Street, where it shortly encounters the southbound segment of the route on Old York Road onto which the northbound route makes a right turn, only to turn left at East Hunting Park Avenue, where it reaches Broad Street near the Hunting Park BSL station again. The line heads northeast along Roosevelt Boulevard, then turns on Bristol Street, only to head south on Old York Road again, until it reaches Luzerne Street, and makes another left on its way to the intersection with 10th Street. 

As of 2008, all buses along this route are ADA-compliant, and contain bicycle racks.  While SEPTA plans to evaluate the possibility of restoring Route 56 line as light-rail service, no such proposal exists for SEPTA Route 53.

References

External links
SEPTA Route 53 (Official Map and Schedule)
Former Route 53 Trolley (World-NYC-Subway.org)
1974 SEPTA Trolley History Brochure

53
53
Tram routes in Philadelphia
Transportation in Philadelphia
Railway lines closed in 1981